Radenović (Cyrillic script: Раденовић) is a Serbian surname derived from a masculine given name Raden. It may refer to:

Ivan Radenović (born 1984), basketball player
Pavle Radenović (fl. 1381–1415), nobleman
Vasilije Radenović, (born 1994), Montenegrin footballer
Veljko Radenović (1955–2012), police general
Zdravko Rađenović (born 1952), Bosnia and Herzegovina former handball player

Serbian surnames
Patronymic surnames
Surnames from given names